The Grammy Award for Best Small Ensemble Performance (from 2013: Best Chamber Music/Small Ensemble Performance) has been awarded since 1997.  In its early years, its title included the addition "(with or without a conductor)".

In 1991 the Grammy for Best Chamber Music Performance also included small ensemble performances.

2012 overhaul and 2013 renaming
In 2012 the category was combined with the Best Chamber Music Performance category.

The restructuring of these categories was a result of the Recording Academy's wish to decrease the list of categories and awards. According to the Academy, "the Chamber category was folded into the Small Ensemble category, the only distinction having been the number of players in the group (Chamber being smaller), and the fact that Small Ensemble recording could, though not necessarily, employ a conductor." 

In the new structure, recordings are eligible if the ensemble contains 24 or fewer members, not including the conductor. 

In 2013, the category was renamed as Best Chamber Music/Small Ensemble Performance.

The award goes to the winning ensemble and its conductor (if applicable). The producer(s) and engineer(s) also receive an award if they have worked on over 50% of playing time on the album.

Years reflect the year in which the Grammy Awards were presented, for works released in the previous year.

Winners and nominees

References

Grammy Awards for classical music